Wolvega, is the largest town in the municipality of Weststellingwerf in the province of Friesland (Fryslan), in the Netherlands. It had a population of around 13,090 in 2021. Wolvega is the capital and largest town of the municipality.

History 
The village was first mentioned in 1218, and means "settlement of Wolf (person)." The Dutch Reformed church was built in 1646 using material from its medieval predecessor. The tower was rebuilt after a fire in 1894.

Lycklama State was a stins built in the early 17th century. It was built as a fortified building even though advances in warfare had made the construction obsolete. In 1626, Rinco van Lycklama became grietman (predecessor of mayor/judge) of Stellingwerf-Westeinde. In 1736, it was in a dilapidated state and demolished. The Catholic retirement home Huize Lycklama was later built in its place.

Around 1820, the main road from Leeuwarden to Zwolle was constructed through Wolvega. In 1835, Wolvega became the capital of the municipality of Weststellingwerf. It was home to 1,202 people in 1840. In 1868, the Wolvega railway station station opened. During the 1950s, it became one of the industrial centre of Friesland, and started to develop into a town.

Sights 
The only remaining stins in Wolvega is Lindenoord which was built in 1780 in Louis XVI style. The estate used to organise horse races. The races moved to Victoria Park which hosts the largest horse race of the Netherlands.

There are two windmills in the town, De Gooyer and Windlust.

Gallery

See also
 Victoria Park, Wolvega
 Wolvega railway station

References

Geography of Weststellingwerf
Populated places in Friesland